The Journal of Food and Drug Analysis is a quarterly peer-reviewed open-access scientific journal published by the Taiwanese Food and Drug Administration. It contains review and research articles covering food science, pharmacology, and chemical analysis. The journal was established in 1993 and the editor-in-chief is Gow-Chin Yen (National Chung Hsing University).

Editors
The following persons are or have been editor-in-chief of the journal:

Abstracting and indexing
The journal is abstracted and indexed in:

According to the Journal Citation Reports, the journal has a 2021 impact factor of 6.157.

References

External links

English-language journals
Quarterly journals
Publications established in 1993
Food science journals
Pharmacology journals